Vasan Sitthiket (born on 7 October 1957 in Nakhon Sawan Province, Thailand) is a Thai contemporary visual artist. A graduate of the College of Fine Art in Bangkok, he has works in many fields, including painting and poetry. He has staged three plays, written more than 10 books of poetry, children’s books and political writings.

Works
Active since the 1970s, Vasan's works are often provocative and political in nature. One of his works was a performance art piece, involving fake rubber breasts and buttocks and a simulated rape of the entire nation of Thailand.

In 2000, an exhibition of a new collection that included 50 paintings featuring Thai politicians and military officers in sexually compromising poses was cancelled by Chulalongkorn University, five days before it was to open. 
At the 50th Venice Biennale in 2003, he displayed some large-scale portraits of George W. Bush and other world leaders, created on canvas by using custom-made rubber stamps. 
Vasan's media has also included drawings, woodcut prints, ceramic sculpture, installations and performances.

In 2005, he set up the Artist Party, a political art project that mocked the then-ruling Thai Rak Thai party and prime minister Thaksin Shinawatra. He has supported the People's Alliance for Democracy ("Yellow Shirts") against Thaksin. The group has used his artwork as backgrounds for their demonstration stages, on their T-shirts and propaganda outlets, and Vasan appeared at the rallies to recite poems or perform music.

Vasan exhibited at Thavibu Gallery in 2009 - Capitalism is Dying!

References

External links

Vasan Sitthiket gallery at aRTgazinE
Vasan Sitthiket gallery at Ethan Cohen Fine Arts
 Vasan Sitthiket at Queensland Art Gallery
Performance Site: Myanmar 2005

Sitthiket, Vasan
Sitthiket, Vasan
Vasan Sitthiket
Vasan Sitthiket
Vasan Sitthiket
Vasan Sitthiket
Vasan Sitthiket
Vasan Sitthiket
Vasan Sitthiket